MobySongs 1993–1998, also known as Songs 1993–1998 or simply Mobysongs, is a compilation album by American electronica musician Moby. It features selections from his work released in North America on the Elektra label, before his breakout 1999 release, Play.

Critical reception 

David Browne of Entertainment Weekly recommended the compilation to listeners intrigued by Play, adding, "No blues or gospel samples here, but the same spiritual-techno vibe is evident in brilliant early singles like 'Go,' sighing-keyboard instrumentals, and a hefty share of genre-crossing cuts from 1995's everlasting Everything Is Wrong." John Bush of AllMusic was complimentary of the material itself, which he felt showcased Moby's "continuing excellence in a number of genres", noting that the tracks from Everything Is Wrong and Animal Rights in particular "sound much better in this format, divorced from the rock flame-outs that often surrounded them on the original albums", but criticized the exclusion of his seminal earlier work and the lack of rarities.

Track listing

Personnel 
Credits for MobySongs 1993–1998 adapted from album liner notes.

 Moby – engineering, mixing, production, programming, recording, writing
 Kochie Banton – vocals on "Feeling So Real"
 Curt Frasca – engineering on "Move (You Make Me Feel So Good)"
 Mimi Goese – vocals on "Into the Blue" and "When It's Cold I'd Like to Die"
 Rozz Morehead – vocals on "Move (You Make Me Feel So Good)"
 Alan Moulder – engineering on "Now I Let It Go" and "Living"
 Myim Rose – vocals on "Feeling So Real"
 Hahn Rowe – violin on "Now I Let It Go"
 Carole Sylvan – vocals on "Move (You Make Me Feel So Good)"
 Nicole Zaray – vocals on "Feeling So Real"

Artwork and design
 Patrick Hegarty – artwork, photography

Charts

References

External links 
 
 

Moby compilation albums
2000 compilation albums
Elektra Records compilation albums
Albums produced by Moby